Alexander Mattheus Michel (born August 10, 1970) is an American television personality. He was The Bachelor during its premiere season on ABC in 2002.

Personal life 
Michel was born in Charlottesville, Virginia, the son of a corporate executive and a marriage and family therapist. He has two younger sisters.

At Darien High School, Michel was the valedictorian, student body president, homecoming king, and captain of the swim team. He graduated with honors from Harvard College, majoring in History and Literature, and was a member of the varsity swimming and water polo teams. During college, he spent a summer working as an analyst in the Office of Management and Budget in the Executive Office of the President of the United States.

Career 
After college, he worked in the U.S. Embassy in Mexico. He later became a documentary travel video producer, which took him to Australia, Brazil, China, Fiji, India, Japan, Kenya, Malaysia, New Zealand, and Venezuela among others. He speaks Spanish and some Portuguese.

Michel later returned to school and earned an MBA at Stanford University's Graduate School of Business in 1998. He worked at CNET as a television producer, and at the Boston Consulting Group as a management consultant. He was named the Sundance Institute New Producing Fellow for 1993.

The Bachelor 

At the age of 31, a friend at Harvard Business School sent Michel an email about auditions for a new reality show in which a bachelor chooses a wife out of 24 female contestants.  After seven weeks filming The Bachelor, he chose Amanda Marsh (now Amanda Caldwell) over runner-up Trista Rehn, but did not propose to her. After dating Marsh for a year, the couple broke up.

After the airing of The Bachelor, Michel returned to the business world and did a variety of media projects. He became a spokesperson for Match.com, guest-starred on The Re-Run Show, and became a spokesperson for Princess Cruises. He is currently a media industry executive in New York City.

External links

Living people
21st-century American businesspeople
American expatriates in Mexico
American management consultants
Boston Consulting Group people
Harvard College alumni
Businesspeople from Charlottesville, Virginia
Stanford Graduate School of Business alumni
1971 births
Bachelor Nation contestants
Darien High School alumni